Grzegorz Kozdrański (born 7 June 1976) is a Polish diver. He competed in two events at the 1992 Summer Olympics.

References

1976 births
Living people
Polish male divers
Olympic divers of Poland
Divers at the 1992 Summer Olympics
People from Rzeszów
20th-century Polish people